Ezio Vanoni (3 August 1903 – 16 February 1956) was an Italian economist and politician who served as Minister of Finance from May 1948 to January 1954 and Minister Budget from January 1954 until February 1956.

Vanoni is widely considered one of the most prominent economists in Italy's post-war history. His economic and monetary policies strongly influenced the Italian reconstruction and the subsequent economic miracle.

References

1903 births
1956 deaths
Christian Democracy (Italy) politicians
Finance ministers of Italy
Members of the Constituent Assembly of Italy
Deputies of Legislature I of Italy
Deputies of Legislature II of Italy